Gluck is a surname of German or Yiddish origin. the root word means luck in either language. It is a last name found among Ashkenazi Jews and those of German ancestry. However, there is evidence that the composer Christoph Willibald Gluck's surname derives from the Czech word kluk (boy).

Notable people with the surname include:

 Alma Gluck (Reba Feinsohn) (1884–1938), a Romanian-American soprano
 Barbara Gluck (born 1938), American photographer
 Benjamin Gluck, American screenwriter, animator and director
 Carol Gluck (born 1941), American historian of modern Japan
 Christoph Willibald Gluck (1714–1787), one of the most important opera composers of the Classical music era
 Earle J. Gluck (1900–1972), American radio pioneer
 Edgar Gluck (born 1936), rabbi in Galicia
 Frederick Gluck (born 1935), American management consultant
 Henry Gluck (born 1929), American business executive and philanthropist from Los Angeles, California. 
 Herschel Gluck, British rabbi
 Jay Gluck (1927–2000), American archaeologist and art historian
 Louis Gluck (1924–1997), American neonatologist
 Malcolm Gluck, British wine writer
 Mark A. Gluck, American professor of neuroscience
 Maxwell Henry Gluck (1899–1984), American businessman, diplomat, thoroughbred horse breeder and philanthropist
 Michael Gluck (born 1983), American pianist
 Peter L. Gluck, American architect
 Rita Buglass Gluck, American writer
 Robert Gluck (born 1955), American pianist and composer
 Salomon Gluck (1914–1944), French physician and member of the French Resistance
 Themistocles Gluck (1853–1942), German physician
 Will Gluck, American film director, screenwriter, and producer

See also 
 Richard Glücks (1889–1945), a German Nazi official and Holocaust perpetrator
 Andrej Glucks (born 1976), Croatian slalom canoer
 Glack, Glock
 Gluek (disambiguation)
 Gl%C3%BCck_(surname)
 Glick

References 

Ashkenazi surnames
German-language surnames
Jewish surnames
Yiddish-language surnames